Okinawa Prefecture is Japan's southernmost prefecture.

Okinawa may also refer to:
 Okinawa, Okinawa, the second largest city in the prefecture
 Okinawa Island, the largest island in the prefecture
 Okinawa Islands, an island group including Okinawa Island and its neighbours
 Battle of Okinawa, a major battle in the Pacific Theater of World War II, fought between the United States and the Empire of Japan
 Okinawa (film), a 1952 American film by Leigh Jason
 Okinawa Autotech, an Indian electric scooter manufacturer

See also
 USS Okinawa
 Okinawan (disambiguation)
 Ryukyu (disambiguation)